La Piloto is a Spanish-language crime drama television series created by W Studios and produced by Lemon Films Studios for Univision and Televisa. It's an original story based on real-life events and it started airing on American broadcast channel Univision on 7 March 2017, and concluded on Mexican broadcast channel Las Estrellas on 7 October 2018. The series tells the departures of Yolanda Cadena (Livia Brito) and all her efforts to become an airplane pilot.

Synopsis 
The series tells the story of Yolanda (Livia Brito), a young Mexican flight attendant who is discovering how far she is able to reach in order to achieve her great dream: to be an airline pilot. The murder of her father gives her the impetus necessary to fulfill her goal. Her first contact with the world of aviation is to be stewardess, fighting against the multiple obstacles imposed by competing in a totally male environment. John Lucio, a drug lord, is held captive and is in dire need of a ransom, however Zulima, the head of the stewardesses, is unable to make the delivery, and asks Yolanda to do so. Yolanda is thrust into the drug business and John Lucio teaches her how to fly but Dave Mejia is a DEA Agent, whom she initially had feelings for, and puts her in the center of a burning love triangle.

Cast and characters 

 Livia Brito as Yolanda Cadena
 Arap Bethke as John Lucio
 María Fernanda Yepes as Zulima Montes (season 1)
 Alejandro Nones as Óscar Lucio (season 1)
 María de la Fuente as Mónica Ortega
 Verónica Montes as Lizbeth Álvarez (seasons 1–2)
 Natasha Domínguez as Amanda Cuadrado (season 1)
 María Fernanda García as Estela Lesmes (season 1)
 Mauricio Aspe as Arley Mena
 Stephanie Salas as Rosalba Cadena
 Arturo Barba as Zeky Gilmas (season 1)
 Tommy Vásquez as Arnoldo Santamaría
 Macarena Achaga as Olivia Nieves (season 1)
 Juan Colucho as Dave Mejía
 Margarita Muñoz as Andrea Pulido (season 2)
 Oka Giner as Olivia Nieves (season 2)
 Ilza Ponko as Irina Kilichenko (season 2)
 Lisardo as Vasily Kilichenko (season 2)
 Paulo Quevedo as Bill Morrison (season 2)
 Juan Vidal as Bastián Regueros (season 2)
 Julia Urbini as Felicidad (season 2)
 Mauricio Pimentel as Muñeco (season 2)
 Nico Galán as Wilmer Aguilar
 Julio Echeverry as Gilberto Pulido (season 2)

Episodes 
La Piloto premiered on 7 March 2017. On June 29, 2017, producer Billy Rovzar confirmed that the series would be renewed for a second season to be released on 18 June 2018 on Las Estrellas.

Production 
The series is created by W Studios of the renowned producer Patricio Wills and produced by Lemon Films Studios for Univision and Televisa. It is written by Jorg Hiller who previously wrote Tiro de gracias and Porque el amor manda and is inspired by real-life events. Filming of the series began on September 5, 2016. For the filming of the series Livia Brito took aviation classes.

On October 18, 2017, Patricio Wills of W Studios confirmed that the production of the second season of the series would begin in January 2018. On January 26, 2018, the start of production of the second season was confirmed. On February 1, 2018, Ilza Ponko was confirmed as the main villain of the second season. A preview of the second season was released on 8 May 2018.

Ratings

U.S. rating 
 

| link2            = List of La Piloto episodes#Season 2 (2018)
| episodes2        = 56
| start2           = 
| startrating2        = 1.14
| end2             = 
| endrating2          = 1.09
| viewers2         = |2}} 
}}

Mexico rating 
 
}}

Awards and nominations

Notes

References

External links 
 

2017 Mexican television series debuts
Univision original programming
Spanish-language television shows
Las Estrellas original programming
2010s Mexican television series
2017 American television series debuts
2010s American crime drama television series
Aviation television series
Television series produced by Lemon Films
Television series produced by W Studios
2010s American LGBT-related drama television series
Televisa original programming
2017 telenovelas
2018 telenovelas
2018 American television series endings
2018 Mexican television series endings
Works about Mexican drug cartels